Presidential elections were held in Macedonia on 14 April 2004, with a second round on 28 April. They followed the death in an air crash in February of incumbent President Boris Trajkovski.

Prime Minister Branko Crvenkovski of the Social Democratic Union won the first round. As he failed to cross the 50% threshold, a second round was held in which he defeated Saško Kedev of Internal Macedonian Revolutionary Organization – Democratic Party for Macedonian National Unity. In the immediate aftermath, Kedev alleged massive electoral fraud.

Results

References

Presidential elections in North Macedonia
Macedonia
Presidential election
April 2004 events in Europe